Kalaniōpuu-a-Kaiamamao (c. 1729 – April 1782) was the aliʻi nui (supreme monarch) of the island of Hawaiʻi. He was called Terreeoboo, King of Owhyhee by James Cook and other Europeans. His name has also been written as Kaleiopuu.

Biography
Kalaniʻōpuʻu was the son of Kalaninuiamamao (k) and his wife Kamākaʻimoku (w), a high ranking aliʻi wahine (female of hereditary nobility) who was also the mother of Keōua (k) with another husband named Kalanikeʻeaumoku (k). This made her the grandmother of Kamehameha I. During his reign, Alapainui had kept the two young princes, Kalaniʻōpuʻu and Keōua, close to him out of either kindness or politics. 

Kalaniōpuu-a-Kaiamamao was the king of the island during the times Captain James Cook came to Hawaiʻi and went aboard his ship on November 26, 1778. After Cook anchored at Kealakekua Bay in January 1779, Kalaniōpuu-a-Kaiamamao paid a ceremonial visit on January 26, 1779 and exchanged gifts including a ʻahuʻula (feathered cloak) and mahiole (ceremonial helmet), since it was during the Makahiki season. Cook's ships returned on February 11 to repair storm damage. This time relations were not as good, resulting in a violent struggle when Cook tried to take Kalaniʻōpuʻu hostage after the theft of a longboat, which led to Cook's death.

Kalaniōpuu-a-Kaiamamao died at Kāʻilikiʻi, Waioʻahukini, Kaʻū, in April 1782. He was succeeded by his son, Kīwalaʻō, as king of Hawaii island; and his nephew, Kamehameha I, who was given guardianship of Kū-ka-ili-moku, the god of war. His nephew would eventually overthrow his son at the battle of Mokuōhai. The island of Hawaii was then effectively divided into three parts: his nephew Kamehameha ruled the western districts, his younger son Keōua Kuahuula controlled Kaū, and his brother Keawemauhili controlled Hilo.

See also 
 Kidnapping of Kalaniʻōpuʻu by James Cook

References

Royalty of Hawaii (island)
Hawaiian military personnel
1720s births
1782 deaths
House of Keawe
Burials at the Royal Mausoleum (Mauna ʻAla)
Year of birth uncertain